Kim Ha-yeon (born on 6 February, 2010) is a South Korean child actress. She made her acting debut in 2016 and established her by portraying young version of various characters. She is better known for her role in rom-com Fight for My Way (2017) and 2020 film The Singer. She also appeared in films such as: The Preparation (2017) and Kim Ji-young: Born 1982 (2019) among others. In March 2022 she was cast in KBS's daily drama Bravo, My Life.

Career
Kim debuted in 2016 by appearing in small roles in a film and TV series. She was noticed as child actor in  2017 when she was cast in MBC drama Children of the 20th Century, KBS drama Fight for My Way as young Seol-hee, and as Eun-ji in the tvN drama stage The Picnic Day. Later she took on the role of Na-eun in film Romans 8:37 and Mi-sol, the daughter of Moon-kyeong (Yoo Sun) in The Preparation. In 2018 she was cast in a short role in tvN drama Live, as young Han Yeo-reum in Where Stars Land and as Han Yoo-ri in Ms. Ma, Nemesis. Kim also appeared in historical film Rampant in the same year. In 2019 she was seen in film Kim Ji-young: Born 1982, which was a commercial success with 3.67 million persons watching it.

In 2020 she was nominated for Best Young Actress in 2020 KBS Drama Awards for her role as Jeong byori in No Matter What.

In 2021, Kim was made 'Goo-Kee Friends' ambassadors for the 9th Seoul Guro International Children's Film Festival along with Krystal Jung.

Filmography

Films

Television series

Awards and nominations

References

External links
 
 Kim Ha-yeon on KMDb
 Kim Ha-yeon on Daum 
 

Living people
2010 births
South Korean child actresses
21st-century South Korean actresses
South Korean film actresses
South Korean television actresses